Chappelow is a surname. Notable people with the surname include:

Allan Chappelow (1919–2006), British writer and photographer
Archibald Cecil Chappelow (1886–1976), British fine arts expert
Eric Chappelow (1890–1957), British poet and a World War I conscientious objector
Grace Chappelow (1884–1971), British suffragette 
Leonard Chappelow (1683–1768), British clergyman and orientalist